It was a Dacian fortified town.

References

Dacian fortresses in Botoșani County
Historic monuments in Botoșani County
History of Western Moldavia